Brett Gary Beukeboom (born 13 August 1990) is a former rugby union lock who played for Canada.
Beukeboom made his debut for Canada in 2012 and was part of the Canada squad at the 2015 Rugby World Cup.

References

External links

Living people
Canadian rugby union players
1990 births
Canada international rugby union players
Place of birth missing (living people)
Canadian expatriate sportspeople in England
Rugby union locks